Blonde and Blonder is a 2008 Canadian comedy film directed by Dean Hamilton and starring Pamela Anderson, Denise Richards, and Emmanuelle Vaugier. The film was released on January 18, 2008.

Plot
Two dumb blondes, Dee Twiddle and Dawn St. Dom, meet each other for the first time at their first lesson in flight school and they like each other right away due to their numerous similarities. Dee is a professional dancer who has breast implants and a gassy pet turtle named Virgil. Dawn is a former secretary who has tried to be a dancer. After meeting with each other in flight school, Dawn takes off the machine, believing that Dee is the teacher, but she also believed that Dawn was her teacher. Once they realized it’s both their first lesson, the girls panic and the plane crashes on a golf course, but both blondes survive the accident without injuries. The blondes quickly become best friends and they notice that they have been next-door neighbors for nearly a year.

Dee decides to help Dawn get a dancing gig at the Beaver Patch Lounge. Meanwhile, the Vancouver Italian Mafia decides to whack Lou Rimoli, a former mafia member and current informant, who is running the Beaver Patch Lounge. Rimoli is being protected by two agents. The Godfather of the mob sends two female assassins, Cat and Kit to whack Rimoli. The assassins succeed. However, Rimoli is murdered right before Dee and Dawn's audition. The Mobsters, Leo and Swan were supposed to monitor what was happening, after seeing Dee and Dawn run from the club, they mistake the blondes for being the infamous assassins Cat and Kit.

Believing that Dee and Dawn are assassins, Leo and Swan offer them $250,000 to "take out" Hang Wong, the head of the Triads in Niagara Falls, Ontario. Dee and Dawn agree, but they think that they have to take Wong on a date. Federal agents discover the plan to kill Wong and follow the blonde duo also thinking they are Cat and Kit. The Godfather sends Leo and Swan to follow the girls to make sure Wong gets whacked. Once the blonde duo arrive in Niagara Falls, they settle at a casino hotel and resort, which Mr. Wong owns. Cat and Kit also arrive there and find out that Dee and Dawn are pretending to be them and have been the hired assassins. They plan to get revenge because Dee and Dawn stole their reputation for whacking Rimoli and are pretending to be them to kill Wong.

While Dawn is winning money at the casino, Dee meets Mr. Wong during his meeting with Leo and Swan.  Dee tells Wong that Leo and Swan hired her to show him a good time. Federal agents spot Dee with Wong in the casino, and chase them. Wong decides to kidnap Dee and takes her to his yacht.  Meanwhile, they are chased by the federal agents, Dawn, Cat and Kit. The federal agents and police take everyone into custody.

Back at the casino, the police arrest Kit and Cat, and also Wong for kidnapping Dee. Dawn and Dee kiss despite that Dawn finally finds her dream man (who had joined her in the boat chase), and with the millions of dollars Dawn won at the casino, Dee and Dawn establish Dee and Dawn's Famous Turtle Sanctuary in the countryside where they only have one turtle but promise to have more soon.

Cast

References

External links
 
 
 
 
 Blonde and Blonder at Yahoo! Movies
 Blond and Blonder on MovieSet.com

2000s crime comedy films
2000s female buddy films
2008 comedy films
2008 films
Canadian crime comedy films
English-language Canadian films
Fictional duos
Films shot in Los Angeles
Films shot in Vancouver
2000s English-language films
2000s Canadian films
Canadian gangster films